Shoal Creek is a private, gated/guarded residential community in Shelby County, Alabama, United States. Its population was 274 as of the 2010 census. The population is constantly fluctuating. The community has many features to provide its residents. Shoal Creek Golf and Country Club is located in Shoal Creek. Home of the 2018 U.S. Women's Open Golf Championship. It is a part of the Birmingham, Alabama metropolitan area, approximately 15 miles (24 km) southeast of downtown Birmingham.

Demographics

References

Census-designated places in Shelby County, Alabama
Census-designated places in Alabama